The 1956–57 season is the 77th season of competitive football by Rangers.

Overview
Rangers played a total of 46 competitive matches during the 1956–57 season.

Results
All results are written with Rangers' score first.

Scottish First Division

Scottish Cup

League Cup

European Cup

Appearances

See also
 1956–57 in Scottish football
 1956–57 Scottish Cup
 1956–57 Scottish League Cup
 1956–57 European Cup

References 

Scottish football championship-winning seasons
Rangers F.C. seasons
Rangers